The Beijing–Shanghai high-speed railway (or Jinghu high-speed railway, from its name in Mandarin) is a high-speed railway that connects two major economic zones in the People's Republic of China: the Bohai Economic Rim and the Yangtze River Delta.
Construction began on April 18, 2008, with the line opened to the public for commercial service on June 30, 2011.

The line is one of the busiest high speed railways in the world, transporting over 210 million passengers in 2019, more than the annual ridership of the entire TGV or Intercity Express network.
It is also China's most profitable high speed rail line, reporting a ¥11.9 billion Yuan ($1.86 billion USD) net profit in 2019.

The non-stop train from Beijing South to Shanghai Hongqiao was expected to take 3 hours and 58 minutes, making it the fastest scheduled train in the world, compared to 9 hours and 49 minutes on the fastest trains running on the parallel conventional railway.
On September 21, 2017,  operation was restored with the introduction of China Standardized EMU.

The Beijing–Shanghai high-speed railway went public on Shanghai Stock Exchange in 2020.

Specifications 
The Beijing–Shanghai High-Speed Railway Co., Ltd. was in charge of construction. The project was expected to cost 220 billion yuan (about $32 billion). An estimated 220,000 passengers are expected to use the trains each day, which is double the current capacity. During peak hours, trains should run every five minutes. , or 87% of the railway, is elevated. There are 244 bridges along the line. The line also includes 22 tunnels, totaling .

The average commercial speed from Beijing to Shanghai was planned to be , which would have cut the train travel time from 10 hours to 4 hours. The rolling stock used on this line consists mainly of CRH380 trains. With power consumption of 20 MW and capacity of about 1,050 passengers, the energy consumption per passenger from Beijing to Shanghai should be less than 80kWh.

History 

China's two most important cities, Beijing and Shanghai, were not linked by rail until 1912, when the Jinpu railway was completed between Tianjin and Pukou. With the existing railway between Beijing and Tianjin, which was completed in 1900, the Huning railway between Nanjing and Shanghai opened in 1908, interrupted by a ferry between Pukou and Nanjing across the Yangtze River. A weekly Beijing–Shanghai direct train was first introduced in 1913.

Passengers had to get off in Pukou with their luggage, board a ferry named "Kuaijie" across the Yangtze, and get on another connecting train in Xiaguan on the other side of the river.

In 1933, the Nanjing Train Ferry was opened for service. Passengers could remain on the train when crossing the river, and the travel time was thus cut to around 36 hours.
The train service was suspended during the Japanese invasion.

In 1956 the trip time was cut to 28 hours, 17 minutes. In the early 1960s, the travel time was further cut down to 23 hours, 39 minutes.

In October 1968, the Nanjing Yangtze River Bridge was opened. The travel time was cut to 21 hours, 34 minutes. As new diesel locomotives were introduced in the 1970s, the speed was increased further. In 1986, the travel time was 16 hours, 59 minutes.

China introduced six line schedule reductions from 1997 to 2007. In October 2001, train T13/T14 took about 14 hours from Beijing to Shanghai. On April 18, 2004, Z-series trains were introduced. The trip time was cut to 11 hours, 58 minutes. There were five trains departing around 7 pm every day, each 7 minutes apart, arriving at their destination the next morning.

The railway was completely electrified in 2006. On April 18, 2007, the new CRH bullet train was introduced on the upgraded railway as part of the Sixth Railway Speed-Up Campaign. In 2008 overnight sleeper CRH trains were introduced, replacing the locomotive-hauled Z sleeper trains.

As the Nanjing Yangtze Bridge connected the two sections of the railway into a continuous line, the entire railway between Beijing and Shanghai was renamed the Jinghu Railway, with Jing (京) being the standard Chinese abbreviation for Beijing, and Hu (沪), short for Shanghai. The Jinghu Railway has served as China's busiest railway for nearly a century. Due to rapid growth in passenger and freight traffic in the last 20 years, this line has reached and surpassed capacity.

Dedicated high-speed rail proposal 
The Jinghu high-speed railway was proposed in the early 1990s, because one quarter of the country's population lived along the existing Beijing-Shanghai rail line In December 1990, the Ministry of Railways submitted to the National People's Congress a proposal to build the Beijing–Shanghai high speed railway parallel to the existing Beijing–Shanghai railway line. In 1995, Premier Li Peng announced that work on the Beijing–Shanghai high-speed railway would begin in the 9th Five Year Plan (1996–2000). The Ministry's initial design for the high-speed rail line was completed, and a report was submitted for state approval in June 1998. The construction plan was set in 2004, after a five-year debate on whether to use steel-on-steel rail track, or maglev technology. Maglev was not chosen due to its incompatibility with China's existing rail-and-track technology and its high price, which is two times higher than that of conventional rail technology.

Technology debate 
Although engineers originally said construction could take until 2015, the China's Ministry of Railways initially promised a 2010, opening date for the new line. However, the Ministry did not anticipate an ensuing debate over the possible use of maglev technology. Although more traditional steel-on-steel rail technology was chosen for the railway, the technology debate resulted in a substantial delay of the railway's feasibility studies, completed in March 2006. The current rolling stock is the CRH380AL, which is a Chinese electric high-speed train that was developed by China South Locomotive & Rolling Stock Corporation Limited (CSR). The other three are CRH380B, CRH380C and CRH380D.

Engineering challenges 

Testing began shortly thereafter on the main line section between Shanghai and Nanjing. This section of the line sits on the soft soil of the Yangtze Delta, providing engineers an example of the more difficult challenges they would face in later construction.  In addition to these challenges, high speed trains use extensive amounts of aluminium alloy, with specially designed windscreen glass capable of withstanding avian impacts.

Construction 
Construction work began on April 18, 2008. Track-laying was started on July 19, 2010, and completed on November 15, 2010. On January 10, 2011, another 16-car modified CRH380BL train set a speed record of  during a test run. The overhead catenary work was completed on February 4, 2011 for the entire line. According to CCTV, more than 130,000 construction workers and engineers were at work at the peak of the construction phase.

According to the Ministry of Railways, construction has used twice as much concrete as the Three Gorges dam, and 120 times the amount of steel in the Beijing National Stadium.  There are 244 bridges and 22 tunnels built to standardized designs, and the route is monitored by 321 seismic, 167 windspeed and 50 rainfall sensors.

Start of service 

Tickets were put on sale at 09:00 on June 24, 2011, and sold out within an hour. To compete with the new train service, airlines slashed the cost of flights between Beijing and Shanghai by up to 65%. Economy air fares between Beijing and Shanghai fell by 52%.

Sleeper bullet trains on the upgraded railway were cancelled at the beginning, but later resumed. The new line will increase the freight capacity of the old line by 50 million tons per year between Beijing and Shanghai.

In its second week in service, the system experienced three malfunctions in four days.
On July 10, 2011, trains were delayed after heavy winds and a thunderstorm caused power supply problems in Shandong. On July 12, 2011, trains were delayed again when another power failure occurred in Suzhou. On July 13, 2011, a transformer malfunction in Changzhou forced a train to halve its top speed, forcing passengers to take a backup train. Within two weeks after opening, airline prices had rebounded due to frequent malfunctions on the line.
Airline ticket sales were only down 5% in July 2011 compared to June 2011, after the opening of the line. On August 12, 2011, after several delays caused by equipment problems, 54 CRH380BL trains running on this line were recalled by their manufacturer. They returned to regular service on November 16, 2011. A spokesman for the Ministry of Railways apologized for the glitches and delays, stating that in the two weeks since service had begun only 85.6% of trains had arrived on time.

Finances 
In 2006, it was estimated that the line would cost between CN¥130 billion (US$16.25 billion) and ¥170 billion ($21.25 billion). The following year, the estimated cost had revised to ¥200 billion ($25 billion), or ¥150 million per kilometer. Due to rapid rises in the costs of labor, construction materials and land acquisitions over the previous years, by July 2008, the estimated cost was increased to ¥220 billion ($32 billion). By then, the state-owned company Beijing–Shanghai high-speed railway, established to raise funds for the project, had raised ¥110 billion, with the remaining to be sourced from local governments, share offerings, bank loans and, for the first time for a railway project, foreign investment. In the end, investment in the project totaled ¥217.6 billion ($34.7 billion).

In 2016 it was revealed, that last year the Beijing–Shanghai High-Speed Railway Company (BSHSRC) has total assets of ¥181.54 billion ($28 billion), revenue ¥23.42 billion ($3.6 billion) and a net profit ¥6.58 billion (US$1 billion), thus being labeled as the most profitable railway line in the world. In 2019, Jinghu Express Railway Company submitted an application for an IPO. The company announced that the Jinghu HSR recorded a net profit of ¥9.5 billion (US$1.35 billion) in the first nine months of 2019.

In 2020, BSHSRC went public, as the first high-speed rail operator in China. The proceeds of the IPO will be used to purchase a 65% stake in the Beijing Fuzhou Railway Passenger Dedicated Line Anhui Company, which operates the Hefei–Bengbu high-speed railway, Hefei–Fuzhou high-speed railway (Anhui section), Shangqiu–Hangzhou high-speed railway (Anhui section, still under construction) and Zhengzhou–Fuyang high-speed railway (Anhui section).

Rolling stock 

 services use the CR400AF, CR400BF, CRH380A, CRH380B, and CRH380C trainsets, prior to 2014 slower  services use CRH2 and CRH5 trainsets. First and Second Class coaches are available on all trains. On the shorter trains, a six-person Premier Class compartment is available. Available on the longer trains are up to 28 Business Class seats and a full-length dining car.

Operation and ridership 
More than 90 trains a day run between Beijing South and Shanghai Hongqiao from 07:00 until 18:00.

The line's average daily ridership in its initial two weeks of operation was 165,000 passengers daily, while 80,000 passengers every day continued to ride on the slower and less expensive old railway.
The figure of 165,000 daily riders was three-quarters of the forecast of 220,000 daily riders. After the opening passengers numbers continued to grow, with 230,000 passengers using the line each day by 2013. By March 2013, the line had carried 100 million passengers. By 2015, daily ridership grew to 489,000 passengers per day. By 2017, average daily ridership reached over 500,000 passengers per day.

This line is gradually gaining popularity through the years and it is reaching its capacity at weekends and holidays. The fastest train will complete the journey in 4 hours 18 minutes (G7), while making two stops along the trip at Jinan and Nanjing.

In 2019, in response to high passenger demand 17 car long Fuxing trains started operating on the line.

Fares 

On June 13, 2011, the list of fares was announced at a Ministry of Railways press conference. The fares from Beijing South to Shanghai Hongqiao in RMB Yuan are listed below:

Note: *Only available on services using the CRH380AL, CRH380BL and CRH380CL trains

On June 14, 2011, the list of stop-by-stop fares was published on the Ministry of Railways' website.

With tickets priced at ¥1750 one way in the sightseeing compartment at the ends of the trains, passengers can sit behind the driver. Tickets at the same price all feature seats which recline in full. Holders of these tickets are additionally given free lounge access at major stations, are served a free meal onboard close to meal times, and are given unlimited refills of non-alcoholic drinks while on board.

Online ticketing service 
Passengers can buy tickets online. If the passenger uses a 2nd-generation PRC ID Card or an International Passport, they can use this card directly as the ticket to enter the station and pass the ticketing gates.

Components

Stations and service 
There are 24 stations on the line. Cruise speeds are  depending on services. Fare are calculated based on distance traveled regardless of speed and travel time. More than 40 pairs of daily scheduled train services travel end-to-end along this route, and hundreds more that only use a segment of it.

Note:

* – Lines in italic text are under construction or planned

The travel time column in the following table only list shortest time possible to get to a certain station from Beijing. Different services make different stops along the way and there is no services that stop at every station.

Bridges

The railway line has some of the longest bridges in the world. They include:

 Danyang–Kunshan Grand Bridge – longest bridge in the world.
 Tianjin Grand Bridge – fourth longest bridge in the world.
 Beijing Grand Bridge
 Cangzhou–Dezhou Grand Bridge
 Nanjing Qinhuai River Bridge
 Zhenjiang Beijing–Hangzhou Canal Bridge

References

External links 

High-speed railway lines in China
Standard gauge railways in China
2011 establishments in China
Rail transport in Shanghai
Railway lines opened in 2011
25 kV AC railway electrification